Pakistan and state-sponsored terrorism refers to the involvement of Pakistan in terrorism through the backing of various designated terrorist organizations. Pakistan has been frequently accused by various countries, including its neighbours Afghanistan, India, and Iran, as well as by the United States, the United Kingdom, Germany, and France, of involvement in a variety of terrorist activities in both its local region of South Asia and beyond. Pakistan's northwestern tribal regions along the Afghanistan–Pakistan border have been described as an effective safe haven for terrorists by Western media and the United States Secretary of Defense, while India has accused Pakistan of perpetuating the insurgency in Jammu and Kashmir by providing financial support and armaments to militant groups, as well as by sending state-trained terrorists across the Line of Control and de jure India–Pakistan border to launch attacks in Indian-administered Kashmir and India proper, respectively. According to an analysis published by the Saban Center for Middle East Policy at the Brookings Institution in 2008, Pakistan was reportedly, "with the possible exception of Iran, perhaps the world's most active sponsor of terrorist groups... aiding these groups that pose a direct threat to the United States. Pakistan's active participation has caused thousands of deaths in the region; all these years Pakistan has been supportive to several terrorist groups despite several stern warnings from the international community." Daniel Byman, a professor and senior analyst of terrorism and security at the Center For Middle East Policy, also wrote that, "Pakistan is probably 2008's most active sponsor of terrorism". In 2018, the former Prime Minister of Pakistan, Nawaz Sharif, suggested that the Pakistani government (see The Establishment) played a role in the 2008 Mumbai attacks that were carried out by Lashkar-e-Taiba, a Pakistan-based Islamist terrorist group. In July 2019, Pakistani Prime Minister Imran Khan, on an official visit to the United States, acknowledged the presence of some 30,000–40,000 armed terrorists operating on Pakistani soil. He further stated that previous administrations were hiding this truth, particularly from the United States, for the last 15 years during the War on Terror.

The United States' State Sponsors of Terrorism designation list describes Pakistan as a "terrorist safe haven" where individual terrorists and terrorist groups are able to organize, plan, raise funds, communicate, recruit, train, transit, and operate in relative security because of inadequate/supportive governance, political will, or both. Osama bin Laden, the leader of al-Qaeda and mastermind behind the September 11 attacks on the United States in 2001, was killed by U.S. Navy SEALs during Operation Neptune Spear at his compound near the Pakistan Military Academy in Abbottabad, Khyber Pakhtunkhwa, Pakistan.

Background 
Until Pakistan became a key ally in the War on Terrorism, the US Secretary of State included Pakistan on the 1993 list of countries which repeatedly provide support for acts of international terrorism. In fact, many consider that Pakistan has been playing both sides in the fight against terror, on the one hand, demonstrating to help curtail terrorist activities while on the other, stoking it. Pakistani journalist Ahmed Rashid and author Ted Galen Carpenter have accused Pakistan's Inter-Services Intelligence (ISI) of providing help to the Taliban and terrorists in Kashmir.

Allegations of state-sponsored terrorism 

Author Gordon Thomas states that whilst aiding in the capture of Al Qaeda members, Pakistan "still sponsored terrorist groups in the Indian state of Jammu and Kashmir, funding, training and arming them in their war of attrition against India". Journalist Stephen Schwartz notes that several terrorist and criminal groups are "backed by senior officers in the Pakistani army, the country's ISI intelligence establishment and other armed bodies of the state". According to Ted Galen Carpenter, a senior fellow for defense and foreign policy studies at the Cato Institute, "Without the active support of the government in Islamabad, it is doubtful whether the Taliban could ever have come to power in Afghanistan. Pakistani authorities helped fund the militia and equip it with military hardware during the mid-1990s when the Taliban was merely one of several competing factions in Afghanistan’s civil war. Only when the United States exerted enormous diplomatic pressure after the 11 Sept. attacks did Islamabad begin to sever its political and financial ties with the Taliban. Even now it is not certain that key members of Pakistan’s intelligence service have repudiated their Taliban clients.

Afghanistan is not the only place where Pakistani leaders have flirted with terrorist clients. Pakistan has also assisted rebel forces in Kashmir even though those groups have committed terrorist acts against civilians. A disproportionate number of the extremist madrasas schools funded by the Saudis operate in Pakistan." Pakistan's former ambassador to the U.S., Husain Haqqani has said Pakistan sponsors terrorism.

Author Daniel Byman states, "Pakistan is probably today's most active sponsor of terrorism." Writing in an article published by The Australian he stated, "following the terror massacres in Mumbai, Pakistan may now be the single biggest state sponsor of terrorism, beyond even Iran, yet it has never been listed by the US State Department as a state sponsor of terrorism".

Former Pakistani president Pervez Musharraf has conceded that his forces trained militant groups to fight India in Indian-administered Kashmir. He confessed that the government ″turned a blind eye″ because it wanted to force India to enter into negotiations, as well as raise the issue internationally. He also said Pakistani spies in the Inter-Services Intelligence directorate (ISI) cultivated the Taliban after 2001 because Karzai's government was dominated by non-Pashtuns, who are the country's largest ethnic group, and by officials who were thought to favour India.

India has been consistent in alleging that Pakistan was involved in training and arming underground militant groups to fight Indian forces in Kashmir.

Inter-Services Intelligence and terrorism 
The ISI, has often been accused of playing a role in major terrorist attacks across India including terrorism in Kashmir, the July 2006 Mumbai Train Bombings, the 2001 Indian Parliament attack, the 2006 Varanasi bombings, the August 2007 Hyderabad bombings, and the November 2008 Mumbai attacks.

The ISI is also accused of supporting Taliban forces and recruiting and training mujahideen to fight in Afghanistan and Kashmir. Based on communication intercepts, US intelligence agencies concluded Pakistan's ISI was behind the attack on the Indian embassy in Kabul on 7 July 2008, a charge that the governments of India and Afghanistan had laid previously.

The Pakistani intelligence agency, the ISI, is believed to be aiding these organisations in eradicating perceived enemies or those opposed to their cause, including India, Russia, China, Israel, the United States, the United Kingdom and other members of NATO. Satellite imagery from the FBI suggest the existence of several terrorist camps in Pakistan, with at least one militant admitting to being trained in the country as part of the going Kashmir Dispute, Pakistan is alleged to be supporting separatist militias Many nonpartisan sources believe that officials within Pakistan's military and the Inter-Services Intelligence (ISI) sympathise with and aid Islamic terrorists, saying that the "ISI has provided covert but well-documented support to terrorist groups active in Kashmir, including the al-Qaeda affiliate Jaish-e-Mohammed".

President of Afghanistan Hamid Karzai has regularly reiterated allegations that militants operating training camps in Pakistan have used it as a launch platform to attack targets in Afghanistan. He has also urged Western military allies to target extremist hideouts in neighbouring Pakistan. In response to the militants from Afghanistan hiding in the mountainous tribal region of Pakistan, the US and Pakistan agreed to allow US Drone Strikes in Pakistan.

Several detainees at the Guantanamo Bay facility told US interrogators that they were aided by the ISI for attacks in the disputed Kashmir Region.

Links to terrorist groups 
Pakistan is alleged to be a safe haven for terrorist groups including:
 Al-Qaeda
 Lashkar-e-Omar
 Lashkar-e-Taiba (LeT)
 Jaish-e-Mohammed (JeM)
 Sipah-e-Sahaba
 Jaish ul-Adl
Al Badr Mujahideen
Harkat ul Mujahideen
ISIS-KP
Pakistan has, however, denied providing safe haven to any terrorist group.

Pakistan is also accused of giving aid to the Taliban, "which include[s] soliciting funding for the Taliban, bankrolling Taliban operations, providing diplomatic support as the Taliban's virtual emissaries abroad, arranging training for Taliban fighters, recruiting skilled and unskilled manpower to serve in Taliban armies, planning and directing offensives, providing and facilitating shipments of ammunition and fuel, and on several occasions apparently directly providing combat support", as stated by the Human Rights Watch. In 2008, the US stated that the next attack on the US could originate in Pakistan.
There are instances of Pakistan hosting terrorist camps such as the following:
 In June 2009, India's army chief, General Deepak Kapoor, used a meeting with US national security adviser Jim Jones to claim that Pakistan was home to 43 "terrorist camps".
 Many Kashmiri groups also maintain their headquarters in Pakistan-administered Kashmir, which is cited as further proof by the Indian Government. 
 Open public fund raising and recruitment of terrorists from Pakistani society.

Militant outfits about Pakistan
JKLF has openly admitted that more than 3,000 militants from various nationalities were still being trained.

Sympathizing with militants
Jaish-e-Mohammed – Other resources also concur, stating that Pakistan's military and ISI both include personnel who sympathize with and help Islamic militants, adding that "ISI has provided covert but well-documented support to terrorist groups active in Kashmir, including the Jaish-e-Mohammed." Pakistan has denied any involvement in the terrorist activities in Kashmir, arguing that it only provides political and moral support to the so-called 'secessionist' groups. Many Kashmiri groups also maintain their headquarters in Pakistan-administered Kashmir, which is cited as further proof by the Indian Government.

Criticism
The normally reticent United Nations Organization (UNO) has also publicly increased pressure on Pakistan on its inability to control its Afghanistan border and not restricting the activities of Taliban leaders who have been declared by the UN as terrorists.

Alleged Pakistani Army support of terrorists 

Former Pakistan President Pervez Musharraf has admitted that Pakistan supported and trained terrorist groups like Lashkar-e-Taiba (LeT) in 1990s to carry out militancy in Kashmir. From 1979 Pakistan was in favour of religious militancy. "The Kashmiri freedom fighters including Hafiz Saeed and Lakhvi were our heroes at that time. We trained Taliban and sent them to fight against Soviet Union. Taliban, Haqqani, Osama Bin Laden and Zawahiri were our heroes then (during the Soviet-Afghan war). Later they became villains" says Pervez Musharraf.

According to Pervez Hoodhboy, "Bin Laden was the 'Golden Goose' that the army had kept under its watch but which, to its chagrin, has now been stolen from under its nose. Until then, the thinking had been to trade in the Goose at the right time for the right price, either in the form of dollars or political concessions".

Pakistan was also alleged to be responsible for the evacuation of about 5000 of the top leadership of the Taliban and Al-Qaeda who were encircled by Nato forces in the 2001 invasion of Afghanistan. This event known as the Kunduz airlift, which is also popularly called the "Airlift of Evil", involved several Pakistani Air Force transport planes flying multiple sorties over a number of days. However, the validity of these claims have been questioned by the Pentagon. Both United States and Pakistan have rejected that any such airlift took place. General Richard Myers, chief of staff, claimed that Kunduz airfield has been "disabled" by United States attacks. Although part of airfield could be used, the runway was not long enough for transport aircraft to take off or land. Donald Rumsfeld, US defense secretary, claimed that he received no such report that validate or verify these claims of aircraft moving in or out of the city. He further said that he doubted these claims. According to a 2001 article titled "Overview of State-Sponsored Terrorism" issued by the US Office of the Coordinator for Counterterrorism, 
"In South Asia, the United States has been increasingly concerned about reports of Pakistani support to terrorist groups and elements active in Kashmir, as well as Pakistani support, especially military support, to the Taliban, which continues to harbor terrorist groups, including al-Qaida, the Egyptian Islamic Jihad, al-Gama'a al-Islamiyya, and the Islamic Movement of Uzbekistan." In 2011, American troops reportedly recovered Pakistani military supplies from Taliban insurgents in Afghanistan.
 LeT began carrying out operations in Indian-controlled Kashmir in the 1990s. It actively infiltrated militants across the Line of Control (LoC) from Pakistan to carry out sabotage activities with the help of the ISI and the Pakistan Army. Pakistan Army and Inter-Services Intelligence Directorate (ISI) have long considered Lashkar-e-Taiba to be the country's most reliable proxy against India and the group still provides utility in this regard as well as the potential for leverage at the negotiating table.

Lashkar-e-Taiba and Jamaat-ud-Dawa 
The militant group Lashkar-e-Taiba (LeT) is widely blamed for the November 2008 Mumbai attacks. The US has put a $10m bounty for its founder Hafiz Muhammad Saeed. Saeed now heads the Jamaat-ud-Dawa (JuD) group, widely seen as a front for LeT. LeT was banned by Pakistan in 2002 after it allegedly carried out an attack on the Indian parliament. JuD is currently banned by the US, the EU, India and Russia as a terrorist organisation. In June 2014, Washington declared JuD an LeT affiliate and announced head money for JuD's political wing chief and Saeed's brother-in-law Abdur Rahman Makki. Zaki ur-Rehman Lakhvi, the leader of Lashkar-e-Taiba and allegedly the planner of 2008 Mumbai attacks was released in Pakistan which caused condemnations in India.

JuD regularly conducts mass rallies and congregation, advocating jihad in Kashmir. For its December 2014 rally, Pakistan ran two special trains to carry the crowd to Lahore. India's foreign ministry termed this as 'nothing short of mainstreaming of terrorism and a terrorist'. The congregation was held near Pakistan's national monument, the Minar-e-Pakistan and a security of 4000 policemen was provided. JuD also asks donations for its anti-India and pro-jihad campaigns.

Haqqani Network 
Former Chairman of the Joint Chiefs of Staff of US, Mike Mullen described the Haqqani Network as the 'veritable arm of Pakistan's ISI'. Mullen said the country's main intelligence agency ISI was supporting Haqqani network, who are blamed for an assault on the US embassy in Kabul in September 2011 and also the September 2011 NATO truck bombing which injured 77 coalition soldiers and killed five Afgan civilians.

"Operation Zarb-e-Azb has helped disrupt Haqqani network's ability to launch attacks on Afghan territory", a senior commander for US and NATO forces in Afghanistan, Lieutenant General Joseph Anderson said in a Pentagon-hosted video briefing from Afghanistan. He added that the Haqqani network was now fractured too.

In a November 2014 interview to BBC Urdu, Adviser to the Pakistani Prime Minister on National Security and Foreign Affairs, Sartaj Aziz said that Pakistan should not target militants like the Afghan Taliban and Haqqani Network, who do not threaten Pakistan's security. After it was raised in Pakistan's parliament, Pakistan's Foreign Office clarified that the statement was said in historical context.

United States 
US National Security Advisor James L Jones sent a message in the past to Pakistan saying that double standards on terrorism were not acceptable.

In September 2016, the Chairman of the US House Subcommittee on Terrorism, Congressman Ted Poe from Texas, along with Dana Rohrabacher from California, introduced a bill in the United States House of Representatives calling for a declaration of Pakistan as a "state sponsor of terrorism". The bill HR 6069 requires the US president to issue a report within 90 days detailing Pakistan's role in supporting international terrorism followed by discussion from the US Secretary of State. Ted Poe said in a statement that Pakistan was not only an untrustworthy ally but it has also aided and abetted the enemies of the United States. He called the 2016 Uri attack the "latest consequence of Pakistan’s longstanding irresponsible policy of supporting and providing operational space for 'jihadi' terrorist groups". U.S. Senator John McCain said that the bill would not be successful, and pointed out that it was moved by a small minority within the Congress. McCain also acknowledged Pakistan's losses in the fight against terrorism. 

In June 2020, then Prime minister of Pakistan Imran Khan in the parliament said, Osama bin Laden was a "martyr".

United Kingdom 
In July 2010, British Prime Minister David Cameron accused the Pakistani government of double standards: "We cannot tolerate in any sense the idea that this country is allowed to look both ways and is able, in any way, to promote the export of terror, whether to India or whether to Afghanistan or anywhere else in the world." However, UK Foreign Secretary William Hague, who was travelling with the prime minister Cameron, clarified Cameron's remarks: "He wasn't accusing anybody of double dealing. He was also saying that Pakistan's made great progress in tackling terrorism. Of course there have been many terrorism outrages in Pakistan itself." Cameron's remarks sparked a diplomatic row with Pakistan, where he came under attack by officials and politicians who strongly criticised his comments. In December 2010, he attempted to visit Pakistan while on a tour to Afghanistan in an effort to mend relations. However, his visit was refused by Pakistan, notably as a snub to his remarks.

Afghanistan
US intelligence officials claim that Pakistan's ISI sponsored the 2008 Indian embassy bombing in Kabul. They say that the ISI officers who aided the attack were not renegades, indicating that their actions might have been authorised by superiors. The attack was carried out by Jalaluddin Haqqani, who runs a network that Western intelligence services say is responsible for a campaign of violence throughout Afghanistan, including the Indian Embassy bombing and the 2008 Kabul Serena Hotel attack. Citizenship and Immigration Minister of Canada Chris Alexander called Pakistan a state sponsor of terrorism that threatens world security in 2014.

In response to the Afghan War documents leak, The Guardian had a very different take on allegations that Pakistan is sponsoring terrorism. Its Sunday, 25 July 2010 article by Declan Walsh states: "But for all their eye-popping details, the intelligence files, which are mostly collated by junior officers relying on informants and Afghan officials, fail to provide a convincing smoking gun for ISI complicity. Most of the reports are vague, filled with incongruent detail, or crudely fabricated. The same characters – famous Taliban commanders, well-known ISI officials – and scenarios repeatedly pop up. And few of the events predicted in the reports subsequently occurred. A retired senior American officer said ground-level reports were considered to be a mixture of "rumours, bullshit and second-hand information" and were weeded out as they passed up the chain of command".

Afghanistan–Pakistan relations have become more strained after the Afghan government began openly accusing Pakistan of using its ISI spy network in aiding the Taliban and other militants. Pakistan usually denies these allegations but has said in the past that it does not have full control of the actions of the ISI. There have been a number of reports about the Afghanistan–Pakistan skirmishes, which usually occur when army soldiers are in hot pursuit chasing insurgents who cross the border back and forth. This leads to tensions between the two states, especially after hearing reports of civilian casualties.

After the May 2011 death of Osama bin Laden in Pakistan, many prominent Afghan figures began being assassinated, including Mohammed Daud Daud, Ahmad Wali Karzai, Jan Mohammad Khan, Ghulam Haider Hamidi, Burhanuddin Rabbani and others. Also in the same year, the Afghanistan–Pakistan skirmishes intensified and many large scale attacks by the Pakistani-based Haqqani network took place across Afghanistan. This led to the United States warning Pakistan of a possible military action against the Haqqanis in the Federally Administered Tribal Areas. The U.S. blamed Pakistan's government, mainly Pakistani Army and its ISI spy network as the masterminds behind all of this.  U.S. Ambassador to Pakistan, Cameron Munter, told Radio Pakistan that "the attack that took place in Kabul a few days ago, that was the work of the Haqqani network. There is evidence linking the Haqqani Network to the Pakistan government. This is something that must stop." Other top U.S. officials such as Hillary Clinton and Leon Panetta made similar statements. Despite all of this, Afghan President Hamid Karzai labelled Pakistan as Afghanistan's "twin brother". Such words in diplomatic talks mean that Afghanistan cannot turn enemy against the state of Pakistan to please others. The two states are working together to find solutions to the problems affecting them. This includes possible defence cooperation and intelligence sharing as well as further enhancing the two-way trade and abolishment of visas for "holders of diplomatic passports to facilitate visa free travel for the diplomats from the two nations."

After the May 2017 Kabul attack, the Afghan National Directorate of Security (NDS) claimed that the blast was planned by the Afghan insurgent group Haqqani Network, and reiterated allegations that those elements had support and presence across the border in Pakistan. Afghan President Ashraf Ghani stated that Pakistan has instigated an "undeclared war of aggression" against the country. Pakistan's Foreign Ministry spokesman, Nafees Zakaria rejected the Afghan allegations as "baseless".

The Washington Post claimed that the 2021 Taliban offensive was "inextricably linked to Pakistan". According to the New York Times, "Afghan tribal leaders said that the Pakistani military waved a surge of new fighters across the border from sanctuaries inside Pakistan". 

After Taliban took over Afganistan in 2021, then Pakistan Prime minister Imran Khan expressed his happiness and support to Taliban, said, Afganistan broken "shackles of slavery".

India 

The government of Pakistan has been accused of aiding terrorist organisations operating on their soil who have attacked neighbouring India. Pakistan denies all allegations, stating that these acts are committed by non-state actors.

India alleged that the 2008 Mumbai attacks originated in Pakistan, and that the attackers were in touch with a Pakistani colonel and other handlers in Pakistan. The testimony of David Headley, who was implicated for his role in the Mumbai attacks, points to significant ISI involvement in the activities of the LeT, including the Mumbai attacks. This led to a UN ban on one such organisation, the Jama'at-ud-Da'wah, which the Pakistani government is yet to enforce.

On 5 April 2006, the Indian police arrested six Islamic militants, including a cleric who helped plan bomb blasts in Varanasi. The cleric is believed to be a commander of a banned South Asian Islamic militant group, Harkat-ul-Jihad al-Islami, and is linked to the ISI.

Pakistan denied involvement in militant activities in Kashmir, though President Asif Ali Zardari admitted in July 2010 that militants had been "deliberately created and nurtured" by past governments "as a policy to achieve some short-term tactical objectives" stating that they were "heroes" until 9/11.

In October 2010, former Pakistan President and former head of the Pakistan Army, Pervez Musharraf revealed that Pakistani armed forces trained militant groups to fight Indian forces in Kashmir. Many Kashmiri militant groups designated as terrorist organisations by the US still maintain their headquarters in Pakistan-administered Kashmir. This is cited by the Indian government as further proof that Pakistan supports terrorism. Many of the terrorist organisations are banned by the UN, but continue to operate under different names. Even the normally reticent United Nations (UN) has also publicly increased pressure on Pakistan on its inability to control its Afghanistan border and not restricting the activities of Taliban leaders who have been declared by the UN as terrorists. Both the federal and state governments in India continue to accuse Pakistan of helping several banned terrorist organisations, including the Indian organisations unhappy with their own Government, like the ULFA in Assam.

Apart from Kashmir, Pakistan has also been accused by India of supporting insurgency in Punjab province of India. India alleges that Pakistan has provided support to separatist Sikh outfits in an attempt to create independent state of Khalistan. Pakistan has rejected all accusations made by India. An Indian MLA from Punjab believes that Pakistan support to Sikh separatist outfits is an attempt to seek revenge for Indian role during the Bangladesh Liberation War. Former Pakistani army chief Mirza Aslam Beg in an interview embraced jihad against India and opportunity to use Kartarpur corridor to assist Khalistan movement.

In 2019, Pakistani Prime Minister publicly discouraged Pakistani people from going to Kashmir to do jihad. People who went to Kashmir will do an "injustice to the Kashmiri people". Most of the Pakistani militants who had crossed the border over the years and were caught by the Indian security forces were found to belong to the Punjab province of Pakistan.

Bangladesh 
In two separate incidents officials of the Pakistani High Commission in Dhaka, were alleged to be financing the terrorist activities of the banned Jamaat-ul-Mujahideen Bangladesh (JMB) organization. Diplomatic official Mazhar Khan was charged by Bangladesh's foreign ministry of running an illegal Indian currency business in Dhaka beside alleged links with militants. However, Pakistan's foreign office maintains that allegations against him are baseless and the incident is unfortunate.

In December 2015, Pakistan decided to withdraw second secretary Farina Arshad after the Bangladeshi authorities asked the diplomat to leave for reportedly having "extended financial support to a suspected militant who faces spying charges." JMB operative Idris Sheikh, who also holds Pakistani nationality had claimed he had received money from her and was in contact with her for some time. Pakistan has withdrawn one of its diplomats from Bangladesh after "harassment", the foreign ministry said. A formal statement from Islamabad dismissed the charges as "baseless", adding: "an incessant and orchestrated media campaign was launched against her on spurious charges"

International isolation
Pakistan has been threatened in the past of international isolation on allegations of its inability in counter terrorism. The 2016 SAARC summit which was to be held in Islamabad in 2016 was cancelled after being boycotted by four nations – India, Afghanistan, Bangladesh and Bhutan. Pakistan is listed on the FATF greylist for alleged money laundering and terrorism financing, which makes it difficult for the country to get financial help from international institutions, including the International Monetary Fund, World Bank Asian Development Bank, and European Union. 

India has not played bilateral cricket with Pakistan since 2013 and, since 2008, has not allowed Pakistani players to participate in the lucrative cricket league, the Indian Premier League (IPL). The Indian cricket team no longer tours Pakistan. Indians also banned Pakistani actors, singers or directors to work in Hindi cinema and the Indian film industry. After the Pulwama terrorist attack, 'All Indian Cine Workers' Association' announced a total ban on Pakistani artists and actors from working in India. A majority of the people in India are also against having any sports or cultural ties with Pakistan.

Al Qaeda leaders killed or captured in Pakistan 

Critics had accused Pakistan's military and security establishment of protecting Osama bin Laden, until he was found and killed by US forces. This issue was expected to worsen US ties with Pakistan. Bin Laden was killed in his residence of more than five years, in Abbottabad, Pakistan. It was an expensive compound, less than 100 kilometres' drive from the capital, Islamabad, probably built specifically for Bin Laden. Pakistan's President Zardari has denied that his country's security forces may have sheltered Osama bin Laden.

Steve Coll states that as of 2019 there is no direct evidence showing Pakistani knowledge of bin Laden's presence in Abbottabad. Documents captured from the Abbottabad compound generally show that bin Laden was wary of contact with Pakistani intelligence and police, especially in light of Pakistan's role in the arrest of Khalid Sheikh Mohammed. According to Coll: "C.I.A. and other Obama administration officials have said they possess no evidence—no intercepts, no unreleased documents from Abbottabad—that Kayani or Pasha or any other I.S.I. officer knew where bin Laden was hiding. Given the hostility toward Pakistan prevalent in the American national security bureaucracy by 2011, if the United States possessed such hard evidence, it almost certainly would have leaked." In response to America's exposure of bin Laden's hiding place, Pakistan moved to shut down the informant network that led the Americans there.

In addition to bin Laden and Khalid Sheikh Mohammed, Ramzi bin al-Shibh, Abu Zubaydah, Abu Laith al Libi and Sheikh Said Masri have all been captured or killed inside Pakistan.

See also 
 Inter-Services Intelligence activities in Afghanistan
 Inter-Services Intelligence activities in India
 Iran and state-sponsored terrorism
 Israel and state-sponsored terrorism
 Qatar and state-sponsored terrorism
 Saudi Arabia–United States relations#Allegations of funding terrorism
 Terrorism and the Soviet Union
 United States and state-sponsored terrorism

References

Kashmir conflict
History of the foreign relations of Pakistan
State-sponsored terrorism
India–Pakistan relations
Afghanistan–Pakistan relations
Pakistan–United States relations